Hansa is a 2012  independent feature film in Hindi written, directed and produced by Manav Kaul. The directorial debut film is set in an unnamed Himalayan village where the protagonists Hansa and his elder sister Cheeku search for their missing father. Upon its release the film received critical acclaim.

It was made at a low cost of 700,00 Indian rupees (approximately USD 12,739, as of 2012, the time of making the film). The film was shot in a village in Uttarakhand, India.

During an interview aired on  The Lallantop, an Indian online news channel, director Manav Kaul mentioned that the film is available for free viewing on YouTube.

Plot summary
The movie revolves around a young boy, Hansa, and his sister, Cheeku. Their father has mysteriously disappeared while their mother is pregnant and about to deliver. The father has mortgaged their home against unpaid debts, and now it is left to young Cheeku to save her home. She is at the receiving end of a powerful villager's lecherous advances while young Hansa is too restless and distracted to pay attention to all the trouble his sister is facing. For Hansa his troubles revolve around a small red tennis ball which has got entangled high in a large tree and a five rupee coin stolen from a local bully.

Cast 
 Trimala Adhikari as Cheeku 
 Suraj Kabadwal as Hansa
 Kumud Mishra as Bajju da
 Abhay Joshi as Lohni
 Bhushan Vikas
 Ashish Pathode
 Ghanshyam Lalsa as Laddu
 Farrukh Seyer as Tikum

Release and reception
The film was released in India by PVR Pictures as part of their "Director's Rare" film package on 28 December 2012.

Hansa has received critical acclaim after its premiere at the 2012 Osian's Cinefan Festival of Asian and Arab Cinema. There, it received two awards, the Best Film Audience Vote and Best Film Critics Award.

Hansa has also been cited by BBC Hindi as one of the must-watch Hindi films of 2012 from India.

References

External links
 
 Hansa: Full feature film on YouTube

 Hansa on Indiancine.ma

2010s Hindi-language films
Indian independent films
2012 directorial debut films
2012 films
Films shot in Uttarakhand
Films set in the Himalayas